Lie Down in Darkness is the first novel by American novelist William Styron, published in 1951. Written when he was 26 years old, the novel received a great deal of critical acclaim.

After graduating from Duke University in 1947, Styron took an editing position with McGraw-Hill in New York City. After provoking his employers into firing him, he set about writing his first novel in earnest. Three years later, he published the novel, Lie Down in Darkness. Styron had first written the book under the working title Inheritance of Night; he made two revisions of the draft before publishing it under its eventual title.

Among the honors bestowed on Lie Down in Darkness was the prestigious Rome Prize, awarded by the American Academy in Rome and the American Academy of Arts and Letters. Styron was unable to immediately accept the award because he was recalled into the military during  the Korean War.

Plot
The novel is about the dysfunctional Virginian Loftis family. It centers on the funeral of Peyton Loftis, one of the daughters, with previous events told in flashbacks by the other characters. The young, psychologically vulnerable Peyton is attached to her father, but finds her mother, Helen, emotionally remote and oppressive. Helen loathes the spoiled and beautiful Peyton, whom she characterizes as a whore. She has given all her love to her crippled daughter, Maudie, leaving no affection for Peyton or her own husband, Milton, who finds solace in a shallow mistress. Milton, who adores Peyton, turns to alcohol as he is spurned by Helen and as Peyton slips away from the family circle. Peyton's marriage is a disaster, also, and she eventually commits suicide. The penultimate section of the story is related in a stream of consciousness style by Peyton herself. In the last part, a recreation of a revivalist meeting, it is suggested that only the Loftis family's black servants may experience genuine mourning for Peyton.

Styron incorporated many actual portions of his home town, the Hilton Village section of Newport News, Virginia. The character of Helen contains some elements of Styron's own stepmother. Part of the story occurs at the James River Country Club, which is still in operation today.

Film adaptation

In August 2012, Scott Cooper was announced as the director of the film adaptation. Word got out that Kristen Stewart was cast in the lead role of Peyton. However regarding casting, the film's production company released the following statement: "While it's exciting to see all the interest the project is generating, the film is still in the pre-production process and no offers to cast have been made as of yet."

References

1951 American novels
Novels by William Styron
Novels set in Virginia
Newport News, Virginia
Novels about suicide
1951 debut novels
Bobbs-Merrill Company books